Bondi Vet is an Australian factual television series. It follows the lives of veterinary surgeon Chris Brown at the Bondi Junction Veterinary Hospital (near Bondi Beach), and emergency veterinarian Lisa Chimes at the Small Animal Specialist Hospital (SASH), in the Sydney suburb of North Ryde.

Also featured on Bondi Vet are Andrew Marchevsky, a specialist surgeon at SASH, and Tim Faulkner of the Australian Reptile Park at Somersby on the New South Wales central coast.

The series first broadcast on 5 February 2009, with the first two full seasons averaging a rating of 0.93 million viewers in the five capital cities. Bondi Vet screened for seven seasons on Network Ten.

From 28 September 2013 to 25 May 2019, the show had been seen on Saturday mornings in the United States on the CBS network, under the title of Dr. Chris: Pet Vet (only using the first name to avoid confusion with the American musical artist of the same name). The program was slightly re-edited by American distributor Litton Entertainment to comply with American requirements regarding educational children's programming.

Bondi Vet: Coast to Coast

In March 2017, Brown announced he was stepping down as host due to his extensive television hosting and presenting schedule. The series production company, WTFN Entertainment, searched for a new host. Over 800 nominations were received in just a week of the announcement and it was revealed that a top 10 would be nominated and the public would decide who the next Bondi Vet would be. In July 2017, a top 5 shortlist of vets from around Australia was revealed.

In November 2017, WTFN Entertainment revealed that the series would showcase multiple vets in the next series instead of one and they would be Dr Peter Ricci, Dr Alex Hynes, Dr Kate Adams, Dr Lewis Hunt and Dr Danni Dusek. The new series would be known as "Bondi Vet: Coast to Coast" and would feature vets from locations all over Australia. In December 2018, it was announced the series would be switching from Network Ten to Nine Network in 2019. In February 2019, WTFN entertainment announced an additional two vets to the cast, with identical twin sisters Alison & Audrey Shen being included in the new series.

Bondi Vet: Coast to Coast premiered in Australia on Nine Network on 11 October 2019 at 7:30 pm and concluded on 29 November 2019. It first premiered in Canada on the Cottage Life TV network on 27 March 2019.

It was officially renewed for a second series in February 2021, which premiered on 14 May 2021, and was renewed for a third series which will air in 2022.

Casts

Bondi Vet team
 Chris Brown , BVSc (Hons) – veterinary surgeon (Bondi Junction Veterinary Hospital)
 Lisa Chimes, BVSc (Hons), MANZCVS – emergency veterinarian at the Small Animal Specialist Hospital (SASH)
 Andrew Marchevsky, BVSc (Hons), MVS, FANZCVS – specialist veterinarian surgeon (SASH)
 Tim Faulkner – general manager (Australian Reptile Park)

Bondi Vet: Coast to Coast team
Peter Ricci, BVSc BVMS – small animal emergency veterinarian (The Animal Hospital at Murdoch University) and wildlife and zoo veterinarian (Perth Zoo)
Alex Hynes BVSc MVS MANZCVS – emergency and critical care veterinarian (Animal Emergency Service)
Kate Adams – veterinary surgeon (Bondi veterinary hospital)
Lewis Hunt – veterinary surgeon
Danni Dusek – veterinary surgeon
 Tim Faulkner – general manager (Australian Reptile Park)
Audrey Shen – mobile veterinarian
Alison Shen – mobile veterinarian

Nominations and awards

Broadcast

The series was broadcast in the United States, on CBS as part of their educational CBS Dream Team Saturday morning programming strand programmed by Litton Entertainment, under the title of Dr. Chris: Pet Vet. The series ran from 28 September 2013 to 25 May 2019. After 2019, it was renamed Pet Vet Dream Team. In Canada, the series is broadcast on CBC Television. In Czech Republic, the series is broadcast on Animal Planet. In the Netherlands, it is broadcast on RTL5 after TLC broadcast the show first. The RTL5 episodes are edited different in comparison to the TLC episodes. In Spain, the series is broadcast on BeMad TV.

Home media

Notes

References

External links
 
 10Play Website
 Production website
 Pet projects keep the Bondi Vet busy
 

2009 Australian television series debuts
2000s Australian documentary television series
2010s Australian documentary television series
2020s Australian documentary television series
Australian factual television series
Television series about animals
English-language television shows
Network 10 original programming
Nine Network original programming
Television shows set in Sydney
Bondivet|Dr. Chris: Pet Vet
Bondivet|Dr. Chris: Pet Vet
Bondi, New South Wales